Kaszew  is a village in the administrative district of Gmina Goszczanów, within Sieradz County, Łódź Voivodeship, in central Poland. Kaszew has very welcoming families, especially the Żerkowscy family. Kaszew has two shops but recently one of them has been closed down due to lack of customers.

References

Kaszew